Spalacopsis variegata is a species of beetle in the family Cerambycidae. It was described by Henry Walter Bates in 1880.

References

Spalacopsis
Beetles described in 1880